German submarine U-29 was a Type VIIA U-boat of Nazi Germany's Kriegsmarine during World War II.

She was laid down on 2 January 1936, launched on 29 August and commissioned on 10 November. During her career U-29 was involved in seven war patrols under the command of Kapitänleutnant Otto Schuhart.

Design
As one of the first ten German Type VII submarines later designated as Type VIIA submarines, U-29 had a displacement of  when at the surface and  while submerged. She had two shafts and two  propellers.

U-29 was fitted with five  torpedo tubes (four fitted at the bow and one at the stern), eleven torpedoes, one  SK C/35 naval gun, 220 rounds, and an anti-aircraft gun. The boat had a complement of between forty-four and sixty.

Service history

U-29 was responsible for sinking the aircraft carrier , on 17 September 1939, the first British warship sunk in the war by enemy action.  The commander of the German submarine force, Commodore Karl Dönitz, regarded the sinking of Courageous as "a wonderful success" and Grand Admiral Erich Raeder, commander of the Kriegsmarine (German navy), directed that Schuhart be awarded the Iron Cross First Class and that all other members of the U-29 crew receive the Iron Cross Second Class.

During U-29s  career, she sank twelve ships, totaling  and one warship of 22,500 tons. At the beginning of 1941, U-29 was removed from front line duty and reassigned to the 24th U-boat Flotilla as a training submarine. The U-boat was used in this role until 17 April 1944 when she was decommissioned and used for instruction.

Fate
U-29 was scuttled in Kupfermühlen Bay, (east of Flensburg), on 5 May 1945 as part of Operation Regenbogen. The wreck was still in situ as of 1993.

Wolfpacks
U-29 took part in one wolfpack, namely:
 Rösing (12 – 15 June 1940)

Emblem
U-29s emblem was an oak leaf, with an anchor, and a knife or dagger.

Summary of raiding history

References

Notes

Citations

Bibliography

External links

 
 The sinking of HMS Courageous

German Type VIIA submarines
U-boats commissioned in 1936
Operation Regenbogen (U-boat)
World War II submarines of Germany
1936 ships
Ships built in Bremen (state)
Military units and formations of Nazi Germany in the Spanish Civil War